Robert Marley (20 June 1909 – 13 May 1995) was a Jamaican cricketer. He played in seven first-class matches for the Jamaican cricket team from 1928 to 1947.

See also
 List of Jamaican representative cricketers

References

External links
 

1909 births
1995 deaths
Jamaican cricketers
Jamaica cricketers
Cricketers from Kingston, Jamaica